B-Room is the seventh studio album by psychedelic rock band Dr. Dog. It was released on October 1, 2013.  It is the band's third release on the ANTI- record label, and the first album they recorded in their newly built studio. It was co-produced, engineered and mixed by Nathan Sabatino. The album reached No. 50 on the Billboard Hot 200

Album info

According to Spin, the new record was a much more collaborative process, as the band “worked together from scratch, mimicking the manner in which they built their studio.”

Dr. Dog released the first track from the album - "The Truth" - on July 22, 2013.

Dr. Dog released the second track from the album - "Broken Heart" - on August 26, 2013.

Dr. Dog released the eleventh track from the album - "Love" - on September 17, 2013.

Dr. Dog made all of B-Room available for streaming on Rolling Stone's website as well as Pandora Radio Premieres on September 24, 2013.

Track listing

 The Truth - 4:26
 Broken Heart - 3:37
 Minding the Usher - 3:27
 Distant Light - 3:24
 Phenomenon - 3:55
 Too Weak to Ramble - 3:57
 Long Way Down - 3:52
 Cuckoo - 4:05
 Twilight - 3:35
 Rock & Roll - 3:08
 Love - 3:42
 Nellie - 3:38
iTunes/Deluxe Download bonus tracks
 Mt. Slippery - 1:48
 Can't Remember - 3:54
 Humble Passenger - 6:36

Personnel
Dr. Dog
Toby "Old Tober" Leaman - vocals, bass, guitar
Scott "Mickenz" McMicken - vocals, guitar, bass, Casio, banjo, percussion, autoharp, samples
Frank "Fx Mackanoid" McElroy - guitar, vocals
Zach "Z.U." Miller - keyboards, piano, vocals, air organ, guitar
Eric "Teach" Slick - drums, percussion, marimba, synth, saxophone, samples
Dimitri "Gasoline Monster" Manos - percussion, marimba, drums, effects, samples, autoharp

References

External links
Dr. Dog, "The Truth" by SPIN.

2013 albums
Dr. Dog albums